Lane Field may refer to:

 Lane Field (baseball), a former baseball venue in San Diego, California, United States
 Lane Field Airport, an airport in Sanger, Texas, United States